Nantwich and Acton Grammar School can refer to:
Malbank School and Sixth Form College: modern school at the end of Welsh Row (after 1921)
Nantwich Grammar School: historical school at 108 Welsh Row (pre-1921)